

The Cook JC-1 Challenger was a 1960s American cabin monoplane built by the Cook Aircraft Corporation.

Development
John Cook founded the Cook Aircraft Corporation in 1968 at Torrance, California to build and market his JC-1 Challenger cabin monoplane design.

The Challenger was a low-winged cantilever four-seat monoplane with an all-metal construction. It was powered by a single  Lycoming O-320 piston engine and had a fixed nosewheel undercarriage. Two prototypes were built, the first aircraft flew in May 1969. A third prototype was built in 1971 but crashed in 1972 killing the pilot Cook. A fourth modified prototype was built by the company but was never certified and the company stop all design and development in the mid 1970s.

Specifications

References

 
 
 aerofiles.com

See also

1960s United States civil utility aircraft
Low-wing aircraft
Aircraft first flown in 1969